Martin Hairer's theory of regularity structures provides a framework for studying a large class of subcritical parabolic stochastic partial differential equations arising from quantum field theory. The framework covers the Kardar–Parisi–Zhang equation , the  equation and the parabolic Anderson model, all of which require renormalization in order to have a well-defined notion of solution.

Hairer won the 2021 Breakthrough Prize in mathematics for introducing regularity structures.

Definition

A regularity structure is a triple  consisting of:
 a subset  (index set) of  that is bounded from below and has no accumulation points;
 the model space: a graded vector space , where each  is a Banach space; and
 the structure group: a group  of continuous linear operators  such that, for each  and each , we have .

,
.
,
,
and the analytic conditions that, given any , any compact set , and any , there exists a constant  such that the bounds
,
,
Here  denotes the shifted and scaled version of  given by
.

References

Stochastic differential equations
Quantum field theory
Statistical mechanics